NGC 2573 (also known as Polarissima Australis) is a barred spiral galaxy located in the constellation Octans, discovered in 1837 by John Herschel. It is the closest NGC object to the south celestial pole.

See also
 NGC 3172 - the closest NGC object to the north celestial pole.

References

External links
 SIMBAD: NGC 2573 -- Galaxy
 

Barred spiral galaxies
Octans
2573
006249